Bermen may refer to:

Claude de Bermen de la Martinière (1636–1719), senior official in New France (Quebec, Canada)
Claude-Antoine de Bermen de La Martinière (1700–1761), Quebec-born son of Claude de Bermen de la Martinière
Laurent Bermen (fl. 1647-1649), notary at Quebec
Lake Bermen, lake in the province of Quebec, Canada

See also
Bremen